Platostoma is a genus of flowering plants in the mint family, Lamiaceae, first described as a genus in 1818. It is native to tropical parts of Africa, southern Asia, Papuasia, and Australia. Mesona and Acrocephalus has been known as its synonyms.

A widely consumed species in this genus is Platostoma palustre (synonyms Mesona chinensis, M. elegans, and M. procumbens), or xiancao (仙草) in Mandarin, sian-chháu (仙草) in Taiwanese, leung fun cho (涼粉草) in Cantonese, sương sáo in Vietnamese, and cincau in Indonesian and Malay.
It is eaten as a snack in drinks, or set as a gel and served as a grass jelly.

In Indonesia the Platostoma palustre leaf is used to make a black jelly; there is also an instant powder variety available.

Species
There are about 44-46 accepted species as below:
 Platostoma africanum P.Beauv — tropical Africa, southern India, Lesser Sunda Islands in Indonesia
 Platostoma annamense (G.Taylor) A.J.Paton — Vietnam, Thailand, Cambodia
 Platostoma axillaris (Benth.) A.J.Paton — Assam
 Platostoma becquerelii Suddee & A.J.Paton — Cambodia
 Platostoma borzianum (Chiov.) ined.. — Ethiopia
 Platostoma calcaratum (Hemsl.) A.J.Paton — southern China, northern Indochina
 Platostoma cambodgense Suddee & A.J.Paton — Vietnam, Thailand, Cambodia, Laos
 Platostoma clausum (Merr.) A.J.Paton — Culion Island in Philippines
 Platostoma cochinchinense (Lour.) A.J.Paton — southern China, Indochina, Java, Sumatra
 Platostoma coeruleum (R.E.Fr.) A.J.Paton — Angola, Zambia
 Platostoma coloratum (D.Don) A.J.Paton — Yunnan, eastern Himalayas, northern Indochina
 Platostoma denticulatum Robyns — central Africa from Cameroon east to Tanzania and south to Angola
 Platostoma dilungense (Lisowski & Mielcarek) A.J.Paton — Zaïre, Tanzania, Zambia, Malawi
 Platostoma elongatum (Benth.) A.J.Paton — Sri Lanka, southern India
 Platostoma fastigiatum A.J.Paton & Hedge — Madagascar
 Platostoma fimbriatum A.J.Paton — Thailand
 Platostoma gabonense A.J.Paton — Cameroon, Gabon, Tanzania
 Platostoma glomerulatum A.J.Paton & Hedge — Madagascar
 Platostoma grandiflorum Suddee & A.J.Paton — eastern Indochina
 Platostoma helenae (Buscal. & Muschl.) ined.. — Mozambique
 Platostoma hildebrandtii (Vatke) A.J.Paton & Hedge — Kenya, Tanzania
 Platostoma hispidum (L.) A.J.Paton — Southeast Asia, southern China, Assam, New Guinea
 Platostoma intermedium A.J.Paton — Thailand
 Platostoma kerrii Suddee & A.J.Paton — Thailand, Cambodia
 Platostoma lanceolatum (Chermsir. ex Murata) A.J.Paton — Thailand
 Platostoma laxiflorum A.J.Paton & Hedge — Madagascar
 Platostoma leptochilon Robyns — Zaïre
 Platostoma longicorne (F.Muell.) A.J.Paton — Queensland, New Guinea
 Platostoma madagascariense (Benth.) A.J.Paton & Hedge — Madagascar
 Platostoma mekongense Suddee — Thailand
 Platostoma menthoides (L.) A.J.Paton — Sri Lanka, southern India
 Platostoma montanum (Robyns) A.J.Paton — Zaïre, Tanzania, Rwanda, Burundi
 Platostoma ocimoides (G.Taylor) A.J.Paton — Thailand, Cambodia
 Platostoma palniense (Mukerjee) A.J.Paton — southern India
 Platostoma palustre (Blume) A.J.Paton — Southeast Asia, southern China, Assam, Bangladesh, New Guinea
 Platostoma rotundifolium (Briq.) A.J.Paton — tropical and southern Africa
 Platostoma rubrum Suddee & A.J.Paton — Thailand, Laos
 Platostoma siamense (Murata) A.J.Paton — Thailand
 Platostoma stoloniferum (G.Taylor) A.J.Paton — Thailand, Laos
 Platostoma strictum (Hiern) A.J.Paton — Zaïre, Angola, Zambia, Malawi
 Platostoma taylorii Suddee & A.J.Paton — Thailand, Cambodia
 Platostoma tectum A.J.Paton — Thailand, Cambodia, Laos
 Platostoma tenellum (Benth.) A.J.Paton & Hedge — Madagascar
 Platostoma thymifolium (Benth.) A.J.Paton & Hedge — Madagascar
 Platostoma tridechii Suddee — Thailand
 Platostoma verbenifolium (Watt ex Mukerjee) A.J.Paton — Assam, Bangladesh, Arunachal Pradesh, Myanmar

References

External links

Lamiaceae
Lamiaceae genera